ABC Wide Bay is an ABC Local Radio station based in Bundaberg broadcasting to the Wide Bay–Burnett region of Queensland.  This includes the towns of Maryborough, Gympie, Hervey Bay and Mundubbera.

History
The station began broadcasting as 4QB in 1948 originally as a relay of the national program. The station was originally based in Maryborough, the traditional capital of the Wide-Bay region. 

The station negotiated with the School of Arts in 1950 to rent out a small office on the first floor of the school's building for broadcast, and thus it was opened 20 November, 1950. Programs originally consisted of music and local information. The station's local services increased over the years, and in 1952 the first proper newsroom was established with Don Harvey at the helm.

In October of that year a new Rural Officer position was established and that person was responsible for putting to air a special rural program every day. In 1954 and 1962 new renovations to the transmitters meant that the station could reach many more communities outside the Maryborough region.

In 1990 the station moved from its Maryborough studios to a new studio at 58 Woongarra Street in Bundaberg, to better broadcast to the region. The ABC still administered a Maryborough bureau, on 146 Bazaar Street, which staffed a rural reporter to cover news from that region.

The ABC closed its Maryborough bureau in the late 1990s to early 2000s.

In April 2022, the ABC opened a new Hervey Bay bureau to improve its coverage of the Fraser Coast. Staffed by two journalists, the new Hervey Bay bureau on Boat Harbour Drive was established as part of the ABC's regional expansion. To mark the bureau's opening, ABC Wide Bay held an outside broadcast at Scarness Jetty, which was attended by Gardening Australia personality Costa Georgiadis.

Transmitters
The station broadcasts through the following main AM and FM transmitters along with low power FM repeaters:

Local Programs
ABC Wide Bay broadcasts four local programs throughout the week.

 Wide Bay Rural Report 6:15 - 6:30 - presented by Megan Hughes
 Breakfast 6:35 - 8:00 - presented by David Dowsett
 Mornings 10:00 - 11:00 - presented by Ross Kay
 Saturday Breakfast 6:00 - 8:00 - presented by Ross Kay

At all other times the station is a relay of ABC Brisbane, which itself at times broadcasts networked programming from across Australia.

Staff
As of 2021, there are a total of ten full-time staff and several casuals at ABC Wide Bay.

References

See also
 List of radio stations in Australia

Wide Bay
Radio stations in Queensland